Baghdadi Arabic is the Arabic dialect spoken in Baghdad, the capital of Iraq. During the last century, Baghdadi Arabic has become the lingua franca of Iraq, and the language of commerce and education. It is considered a subset of Iraqi Arabic.

Phonology

Vowels
The vowel phoneme  (from standard Arabic ) is usually realised as an opening diphthong, for most speakers only slightly diphthongised , but for others a more noticeable , such that, for instance, lēš [why] will sound like leeyesh, much like a drawl in English. There's a vowel phoneme that evolved from the diphthong to resemble more of a long sound, as in words such as kaun [universe] shifting to kōn. A schwa sound  is mainly heard in unstressed and stressed open and closed syllables.

Consonants

Even in the most formal of conventions, pronunciation depends upon a speaker's background. Nevertheless, the number and phonetic character of most of the 28 consonants has a broad degree of regularity among Arabic-speaking regions. Note that Arabic is particularly rich in uvular, pharyngeal, and pharyngealized ("emphatic") sounds. The emphatic coronals (and ) cause assimilation of emphasis to adjacent non-emphatic coronal consonants. The phonemes  ⟨پ⟩ and  ⟨ڤ⟩ (not used by all speakers) are not considered to be part of the phonemic inventory, as they exist only in foreign words and they can be pronounced as  ⟨ب⟩ and  ⟨ف⟩ respectively depending on the speaker.

Phonetic notes:

 is heard in borrowings of non-Arabic languages.
 is pronunciation of // in Baghdad Arabic and the rest of southern Mesopotamian dialects.
The gemination of the flap /ɾ/ results in a trill /r/.

See also
Baghdad Jewish Arabic
North Mesopotamian Arabic

References

Sources
Kees Versteegh, et al. Encyclopedia of Arabic Language and Linguistics, BRILL, 2006.

Further reading
 

Arabic languages
Languages of Iraq